The following lists events that happened during 1935 in Australia.

Incumbents

Monarch – George V
Governor-General – Sir Isaac Isaacs
Prime Minister – Joseph Lyons
Chief Justice – Frank Gavan Duffy (until 1 October) then Sir John Latham

State Premiers
Premier of New South Wales – Bertram Stevens
Premier of Queensland – William Forgan Smith
Premier of South Australia – Richard L. Butler
Premier of Tasmania – Albert Ogilvie
Premier of Victoria – Sir Stanley Argyle (until 2 April), then Albert Dunstan
Premier of Western Australia – Philip Collier

State Governors
Governor of New South Wales – Sir Philip Game (until 15 January), then Alexander Hore-Ruthven, 1st Baron Gowrie (from 21 February)
Governor of Queensland – Sir Leslie Orme Wilson
Governor of South Australia – Sir Winston Dugan
Governor of Tasmania – Sir Ernest Clark
Governor of Victoria – William Vanneck, 5th Baron Huntingfield
Governor of Western Australia – none appointed

Events
26 February – Qantas Empire Airways makes its first scheduled international flight, when a De Havilland Express departs Darwin bound for Singapore.
2 March – A general election is held in Victoria. The UAP-Country Party coalition wins a comfortable majority.
29 March – 141 people drown when a cyclone strikes the pearling fleet off the coast of Broome, Western Australia.
2 April – Stanley Argyle stands down as Premier of Victoria after the Country Party dissolves their coalition with the UAP. He is succeeded by Country Party leader Albert Dunstan.
1 July – The Australian Associated Press (AAP) news agency is established.
2 October – John Curtin replaces James Scullin as leader of the Australian Labor Party.
4 October – Luna Park in Sydney is officially opened.
14 October – The Hornibrook Bridge, connecting Redcliffe and Sandgate in Queensland, is officially opened.
31 December – The cane toad is introduced to Queensland.

Arts and literature

 John Longstaff wins the Archibald Prize with his portrait of Banjo Paterson
 Olive Cotton takes the photograph Teacup Ballet
 Scottish painter Ian Fairweather moves to Melbourne and is soon noticed by local artists as a significant painter.

Sport
 15 February – Cricket: Victoria wins the Sheffield Shield.
 11 May – Rugby league: St. George beats Canterbury 91 points to 6 for the highest score and biggest win in NRL history.
 14 September – Rugby league: The 1935 NSWRFL season culminates in Eastern Suburbs' 19–3 victory over South Sydney in the premiership final. University finish in last place, claiming the wooden spoon.
 5 October – Australian rules football: Collingwood 11.12 (78) beats South Melbourne 7.16 (58) for its tenth premiership. Bob Pratt missed the game due to a car accident.
 5 November – Horse racing: Marabou wins the Melbourne Cup.

Births
 6 January – Ian Meckiff, cricketer
 9 January – Brian Harradine, politician (d. 2014)
 19 January – Johnny O'Keefe, entertainer (d. 1978)
 3 February – Doreen Kartinyeri, Ngarrindjeri elder and historian (d. 2007)
 18 February – Lance Oswald, Australian rules footballer (d. 2019)
 3 March – Mal Anderson, tennis player
 5 March – Philip K. Chapman, astronaut (d. 2021)
 20 March – Jeffrey Miles, judge (d. 2019)
 30 March – John Thornett, rugby union player (d. 2019)
 7 April – Mervyn Crossman, field hockey player (d. 2017)
 10 April – Peter Hollingworth, Bishop and Governor General of Australia
 12 May – Leneen Forde, Governor of Queensland
 15 May – Bill Peach, journalist (d. 2013)
 26 June – Edwin Hodgeman, actor
 30 June – Ken Turner, Australian rules footballer
 2 July – Philip Flood, diplomat and public servant
 4 July – Alan Preen, Australian rules footballer (d. 2016)
 7 July – John Kingston, politician
 9 July – Kevin Parks, Australian rules footballer
 10 July – Wilson Tuckey, politician
30 July – Bruce Reid, politician (d. 2020)
 2 August – Sir Llew Edwards, 23rd Deputy Premier of Queensland (d. 2021)
 6 August – Geoff Harvey, musician and television personality (d. 2019)
 8 August – John Laws, radio personality
 18 September – Geoff Case, football player (d. 2018)
 28 September
Eddie Lumsden, rugby league footballer (d. 2019)
Bruce Crampton, golfer
 7 October – Thomas Keneally, writer
 4 November – Barry Crocker, entertainer
 28 November – Randolph Stow, writer (d. 2010)
 2 December – John Spender, politician and barrister (d. 2022)
 10 December – Steve Condous, politician (d. 2018)
 13 December – Arthur Summons, rugby footballer (d. 2020)
 28 December – Eileen Massey, cricketer (d. 2019)

Deaths
 9 January – Alexander Poynton, South Australian politician (b. 1853)
 8 April – David Watkins, New South Wales politician (b. 1865)
 2 September – Sir Sidney Kidman, pastoralist and entrepreneur (b. 1857)
 22 September – Sir Elliott Lewis, 19th Premier of Tasmania (b. 1858)
 25 September – Tom Richards, rugby union player and military officer (b. 1882)
 8 November – Charles Kingsford Smith, aviator (died in the Andaman Sea) (b. 1897)
 20 December – Martin O'Meara, Irish-born soldier, Victoria Cross recipient (b. 1882)

See also
 List of Australian films of the 1930s

References

 
Australia
Years of the 20th century in Australia